Baja Kunda is a town in eastern Gambia. It is located in Wuli East District in the Upper River Division.  As of 2008, it has an estimated population of 5,924. Located just south of the north bank highway, Baja Kunda boasts an elementary, secondary, and senior secondary school as well as the main health center in the Wuli East district. A few kilometers to the southwest is the old river port of Fattatenda.

References

Upper River Division
Upper River Division